Egon Sharpe Pearson  (11 August 1895 – 12 June 1980) was one of three children of Karl Pearson and Maria, née Sharpe, and, like his father, a leading British statistician.

Career
He was educated at Winchester College and Trinity College, Cambridge, and succeeded his father as professor of statistics at University College London and as editor of the journal Biometrika. Pearson is best known for development of the Neyman–Pearson lemma of statistical hypothesis testing.

He was elected a Fellow of the Econometric Society in 1948.

He was President of the Royal Statistical Society in 1955–56, and was awarded its Guy Medal in gold in 1955. He was appointed a CBE in 1946.

He was elected a Fellow of the Royal Society in March 1966. His candidacy citation read:

Family life
Pearson married Eileen Jolly in 1934 and the couple had two daughters, Judith and Sarah. Eileen died of pneumonia in 1949. Pearson subsequently married Margaret Theodosia Scott in 1967 and the couple lived in Cambridge until Margaret's death in 1975. Pearson moved to West Lavington in Sussex and lived there until his death in 1980.

Works
 On the Use and Interpretation of certain Test Criteria for the Purposes of Statistical Inference (coauthor Jerzy Neyman in Biometrika, 1928)
 The History of statistics in the XVIIth and XVIIIth centuries (1929). Commented version of a series of conference by his father.
 On the Problem of the Most Efficient Tests of Statistical Hypotheses (coauthor Jerzy Neyman, 1933)
 
 Karl Pearson : an appreciation of some aspects of his life and work (1938)
 
 Studies in the history of statistics and probability (1969, coauthor Maurice George Kendall)

References

External links
 Obituary by Herbert A. David (retrieved 1 August 2017)
 Obituary by J. J. O'Connor and E. F. Robertson (retrieved 1 August 2017)

1895 births
1980 deaths
People from Hampstead
Alumni of Trinity College, Cambridge
Academics of University College London
Commanders of the Order of the British Empire
English mathematicians
English statisticians
Fellows of the Royal Society
People educated at Winchester College
Presidents of the Royal Statistical Society
20th-century British mathematicians
Fellows of the Econometric Society
Mathematical statisticians